The Commune of Rome was established in 1144 by Arnold of Brescia after a rebellion led with Giordano Pierleoni. Pierleoni led a people's revolt due to the increasing powers of the Pope and the entrenched powers of the nobility. The goal of the rebellion was to organize the government of Rome in a similar fashion to that of the previous Roman Republic. Pierleoni was named the "first Patrician of the Roman Commune", but was deposed in 1145.

Papal relationship 
In a pattern that was to become familiar in the communal struggles of Guelfs and Ghibellines, the commune declared allegiance to the more distant power, the Holy Roman Emperor, and initiated negotiations with newly elected Pope Lucius II. The commune wanted him to renounce temporal power and take up an office with the duties of a priest. Lucius gathered a force and assaulted Rome, but the republican defenders repulsed his army and Lucius died from injuries received from a stone that hit his head.

Lucius's successor, Pope Eugene III, could not be consecrated in the city due to the resistance. However, he eventually came to an agreement with the civil authority that had deposed Pierleoni, and returned to Rome on Christmas Day 1145. In March 1146 he again had to leave. He returned in 1148 and excommunicated Arnold of Brescia, a political theorist who had joined the commune and was its intellectual leader.

The Pope lived in Tusculum  beginning in 1149 and was not installed as pope in Rome until 1152. The existence of the Republic was precarious. Eugene's successor, Adrian IV, convinced Emperor Frederick Barbarossa to lead an army against the city. Arnold was arrested, tried, convicted, and hanged in 1155. His body was burnt and the ashes cast into the Tiber.

In 1188, shortly after his accession, Pope Clement III succeeded in allaying the half-century-old conflict between the popes and the citizens of Rome with the Concord Pact. The Pact allowed citizens to elect magistrates with the power of war and peace. The Prefect was named by the Emperor and the Pope had sovereign rights over his territories.

From 1191 to 1193, under a radical reduction of the number of senators to a single one, the city was ruled by a Benedetto called Carus homo (carissimo) as summus senator, and Rome had the first municipal statute.

After this, the city was again under papal control, although the civil government was never again directly in the hands of the higher nobles or the papacy.

Battles
1145 – Battle against Tivoli, Italy.
1167 – Battle of Monte Porzio against Holy Roman Emperor, Tusculum and Albano Laziale.
1170 – Destruction of Albano Laziale.
1191 – Destruction of Tusculum.

See also
History of Rome#Roman Commune
14 regions of Medieval Rome

References

Sources
Gregorovius, Ferdinand. History of the City of Rome in the Middle Ages, Vol IV, Part 2.

States and territories established in 1144
States and territories disestablished in the 1190s
Former republics
Italian city-states
Rebellions in Italy
Medieval rebellions in Europe
Commune of Rome
12th century in the Papal States
1144 establishments in Europe
1193 disestablishments in Europe
Medieval communes